Locust Valley Cemetery is a non-denominational cemetery located in Lattingtown, New York, in Nassau County. The cemetery was founded in the 19th Century and designed by John Charles Olmsted and Frederick Law Olmsted, Jr., renowned architects of Central Park. They are the sons of the famed landscape designer Frederick Law Olmsted. The two brothers were among the founding members of the American Society of Landscape Architects (ASLA).

Locust Valley Cemetery is situated on over 32 lushly landscape acres with a park-like setting. The cemetery is owned by its plot holders and managed by an association.

History
Locust Valley Cemetery Association Inc. was incorporated 1917, and a perpetual care fund was established to preserve its natural beauty. Today, that fund is still supported by proceeds from interment sales as well as donations. The principal of the endowment can never be violated based on the laws of New York State.

This 32-acre property is listed on the Smithsonian Register of American Gardens.

Notable interments
 Edith Bouvier Beale, First cousin of Jacqueline Kennedy Onassis and Lee Radziwill
 Robert Abercrombie Lovett (September 14, 1895 Ð May 7, 1986) Fourth United States Secretary of Defense
 Patsy Pulitzer (1928–2011), fashion model, socialite and philanthropist, wife of Lewis Thompson Preston
 William J. Tully, (1870-1930) New York state Senator
 John W. Davis, served as a United States Representative from West Virginia from 1911 to 1913, then as Solicitor General of the United States and US Ambassador to the UK under President Woodrow Wilson.
 F. Trubee Davison as an American World War I aviator, Assistant United States Secretary of War, Director of Personnel for the Central Intelligence Agency, and President of the American Museum of Natural History.
 William Dameron Guthrie, Guthrie Shaped the surrounding community.  Early purchase of Lattingtown in what is now Lattingtown Harbor in the late 19th, early 20th centuries. Guthrie successfully carried out the fight against US Federal income tax until 1913 He was a big financial backer of the Matinecock Neighborhood Association, which in turn supported our fire department, library and worked in conjunction with our school system.  The village was officially incorporated in 1931 with William Guthrie as mayor and town offices located at Meudon.
 Rocky Graziano, an American professional boxer and one of the greatest knockout artists in boxing history. He is interred at the Cemetery along with his wife, Norma Unger.
 Ray Goulding, an American actor and comedian who worked together with Bob Elliott and formed the comedy duo of Bob and Ray.
 Leroy Randle “Roy” Grumman, an American aeronautical engineer and co-founder of Grumman Aeronautical Engineering Co., later renamed Grumman Aerospace Corporation.
 Edward Francis Hutton, American financier and co-founder of E. F. Hutton & Co., one of the largest financial firms in the United States.
 Mona von Bismarck, American socialite, fashion icon and philanthropist.
 Arthur Vining Davis, American industrialist and philanthropist.
 Franklin Nelson Doubleday, Publisher.
 Ava Lowle Willing, Lady Ribblesdale (1868-1958), socialite, First wife of John Jacob Astor IV.
 James Blanchard Clews, was an American railroad executive and banker.
 Whitey Ford, pitcher for the New York Yankees from 1950-67 who won the 1961 Cy Young Award and was inducted into the Baseball Hall of Fame in 1974.
 Ray Lumpp, professional basketball player
 John M. Franklin, United States Army general and the president of United States Lines.
 Robert "Tex" Allen, American actor in both feature films and B-movie westerns between 1935 and 1944. Buried with his wife Evelyn Peirce American film actress during the silent film era, and into the 1930s.
 Lisa Kirk, American actress and singer noted for her comic talents and rich contralto.
 Philip Albright Small Franklin, President and chairman of International Mercantile Marine Company (IMM) from 1916 to 1936.
 Harry Payne Bingham, American financier, sportsman, art patron and philanthropist. He funded a series of expeditions to study marine life.
 Edna Woolman Chase, American who served as editor-in-chief of Vogue magazine from 1914 to 1952.
 Charles Steele, American lawyer and philanthropist who was a member of J.P. Morgan & Co. for 39 years.
 Harrison Williams, American entrepreneur, investor, and multi-millionaire, and third husband of Mona von Bismarck.
 William Robertson Coe, Insurance, railroad and business executive, a major owner and breeder of Thoroughbred racehorses, as well as a collector of Americana and an important philanthropist for the academic discipline of American Studies.
 Devereux Milburn, American champion polo player in the early to mid twentieth century. He was one of a group of Americans known as the Big Four in international polo, winning the Westchester Cup six times.
 Ilka Chase, was an American actress, radio host, and novelist.
 Artemus Gates, was an American businessman, naval aviator, and Assistant Secretary of the Navy.
 Charles Lawrance, was an American aeronautical engineer and an early proponent of air-cooled aircraft engines.
 Dr Andrey N. Avinoff, was an internationally-known artist, lepidopterist, museum director, professor, bibliophile and iconographer, who served as the director of the Carnegie Museum of Natural History in Pittsburgh from 1926 to 1945.
 Allan Aloysius Ryan Jr., was an American financier and politician from New York.

See also 
 List of cemeteries in New York
 National Register of Historic Places in Oyster Bay, New York

References

 Historic Cemeteries of Oyster Bay Town
 Locust Valley Historical Society Collection

Further reading
New York Times Archives: A Place for All Eternity In Their Adopted Land
 Locust Valley Cemetery Website
Guidestar

Cemeteries in Nassau County, New York
Tourist attractions in Nassau County, New York
1917 establishments in New York (state)